Bai Lili (born October 29, 1978) is a female Chinese football (soccer) player who competed at the 2004 Summer Olympics.  In 2004, she finished ninth with the Chinese team in the women's tournament. She played in both matches.
2001 Asian Cup Bronze Medal, score 3 goals in the final of 3rd against Korea Republic.

2002 The Asian Game Silver Medal.

2005 Asian Cup Champion, played 4 matches.

International goals

External links
profile

1978 births
Living people
Chinese women's footballers
China women's international footballers
Footballers at the 2004 Summer Olympics
Olympic footballers of China
Footballers from Shanghai
Asian Games medalists in football
Footballers at the 2002 Asian Games
Asian Games silver medalists for China
Women's association football forwards
Medalists at the 2002 Asian Games